Sala al Barro-Galbiate railway station is a railway station in Italy  . Located on the Como–Lecco railway, it serves the municipality of Galbiate in Lombardy. The train services are operated by Trenord.

Train services 
The station is served by the following service(s):

Milan Metropolitan services (S7) Milan – Molteno – Lecco
Lombardy Regional services (R18) Como – Molteno – Lecco

See also 
 Milan suburban railway network

References 

Railway stations in Lombardy
Milan S Lines stations
Railway stations opened in 1888